The Battle of Plymouth was an engagement during the American Civil War that was fought from April 17 through April 20, 1864, in Washington County, North Carolina.

Battle

In a combined operation with the ironclad ram CSS Albemarle, Confederate forces under Maj. Gen. Robert F. Hoke, attacked the Federal garrison at Plymouth, North Carolina, on April 17. On April 19, the ram appeared in the river, sinking the USS Southfield, damaging the USS Miami, and driving off the other Union Navy ships supporting the Plymouth garrison. Confederate forces captured Fort Comfort, driving defenders into Fort Williams. On April 20, the garrison surrendered.

Plymouth citizens are believed to have taken refuge in the basement of the Latham House during the Battle of Plymouth.

Order of battle

Union forces
Plymouth Garrison: Brig. Gen. Henry W. Wessells
1st North Carolina Infantry (Union)
2nd North Carolina Infantry (Union)
101st Pennsylvania Infantry
103rd Pennsylvania Infantry
16th Connecticut Infantry
85th New York Infantry
10th US Colored Infantry
37th US Colored Infantry
2nd US Colored Cavalry
12th New York Cavalry
2nd Massachusetts Heavy Artillery
24th New York Independent Battery

Naval: Lt. Cdr. Charles W. Flusser (k)
USS Miami
USS Southfield
USS Ceres
USS Whitehead
USS Mattabesett
US Army transport Bombshell

Confederate forces
Hoke's Division: Brig. Gen. Robert F. Hoke
 Hoke's Brigade: Col. John T. Mercer (k)
 6th North Carolina Infantry
 21st North Carolina Infantry
 43rd North Carolina Infantry
 54th North Carolina Infantry
 21st Georgia Infantry
 Ransom's Brigade: Brig. Gen. Matt W. Ransom
 8th North Carolina Infantry
 24th North Carolina Infantry
 25th North Carolina Infantry
 35th North Carolina Infantry
 49th North Carolina Infantry
 56th North Carolina Infantry
 Kemper's Brigade: Col. William R. Terry
 1st Virginia Infantry
 3rd Virginia Infantry
 7th Virginia Infantry
 11th Virginia Infantry
 24th Virginia Infantry

Dearing's Command: Col. James Dearing
 8th Confederate Cavalry
 Virginia Horse Artillery Battery

Branch's Battalion
 Pegram's Battery
 Miller's Artillery
 Bradford's Battery

Moseley's Battalion
 Montgomery (Alabama) True Blues Artillery
 Wilmington Light Artillery

Guion's Battalion
 1st North Carolina Artillery (Companies B, G and H)

Read's Battalion
 38th Virginia Light Artillery Battalion
 Fauquier Artillery (Co. A)
 Richmond Fayette Artillery (Co. B)
 Bloundt's Lynchburg Artillery (Co. D)

Naval
CSS Albemarle: Cdr. James W. Cooke
CSS Cotton Plant

External links
  National Park Service battle description
 Civil War Plymouth Pilgrims Descendants Society

References

1864 in North Carolina
Plymouth
Plymouth
Plymouth
Plymouth
Washington County, North Carolina
Plymouth
Plymouth 1864
Plymouth 1864
April 1864 events
American Civil War orders of battle